Oxyphil cells are found in oncocytomas of the kidney, endocrine glands, and salivary glands.

References

External links
 

Cell biology